G. Kuppuswamy Naidu was one of the earliest Indian entrepreneurs. He established Lakshmi Mills Company, a major textile yarn and cloth manufacturer, in 1910 in Coimbatore, India.

The company has three composite textile units in Coimbatore, Palladam and Kovilpatti. The promoters of the mill were also instrumental in starting various textile machinery companies notably LMW and medical and educational institutions. The unit in Coimbatore in Papanaickenpalayam is also a well-known landmark.

The Indian motorsport legend Sundaram Karivardhan was the grandson of the company's founder and one time managing director. The group companies also promote various sports notably Hockey, Motorsports and Horse racing.

References

Indian businesspeople in textiles
Businesspeople from Tamil Nadu
People from Coimbatore
Textile industry in Tamil Nadu